Kapugallu is one of the largest gram panchayats under Kodad Municipality in the Nalgonda district of Telangana, India. 

Villages in Nalgonda district